Saint Agathodorus was an early Christian martyr in Pergamon, Asia Minor.

Life

Agathodorus was a servant of Carpus, Papylus, and Agathonice.
He was killed by the Romans to encourage his Christian masters to denounce their faith, but they refused and were also martyred.
Probably the martyrdom occurred during the persecution of the Christians under the Roman Emperor Decius, but some sources place it one hundred years earlier under the Emperor Marcus Aurelius.
His feast day is 13 April.

Butler's account

The hagiographer Alban Butler wrote in his Lives of the fathers, martyrs, and other principal saints (1821),

Notes

Sources

3rd-century Christian saints